Since 1992 speed zones can be set by the Department of Transport Management under section 115 of the Vehicle & Transportation Act.

References

Nepal
Transport in Nepal